Nilmaris "Nilmari" Santini Martin (May 25, 1959 – March 25, 2006) was a female judoka from Puerto Rico. She competed for her native country at the 1992 Summer Olympics in Barcelona, Spain, where she was defeated in the second round of the repêchage.

Santini won two silver medals at the 1991 Pan American Games, in the Women's Heavyweight (+ 72 kg) and in the Women's Open Class division, after having claimed the gold medal four years earlier in Indianapolis, United States.

She died in San Juan.

References
 
 Notice about death 

1959 births
2006 deaths
Puerto Rican female judoka
Judoka at the 1992 Summer Olympics
Olympic judoka of Puerto Rico
Pan American Games gold medalists for Puerto Rico
Pan American Games silver medalists for Puerto Rico
Pan American Games medalists in judo
Judoka at the 1987 Pan American Games
Judoka at the 1991 Pan American Games
Medalists at the 1991 Pan American Games
20th-century American women